Antônio Carlos Mendes de Souza, usually known as Antônio Carlos Roy (born 21 June 1970 in São Gonçalo) is a Brazilian football head coach.

Competitions history

Honours

References

1970 births
People from São Gonçalo, Rio de Janeiro
Brazilian football managers
Campeonato Brasileiro Série C managers
Campeonato Brasileiro Série D managers
Casimiro de Abreu Esporte Clube managers
Friburguense Atlético Clube managers
Associação Atlética Portuguesa (RJ) managers
Boavista Sport Club managers
Linhares Futebol Clube managers
Resende Futebol Clube managers
Bangu Atlético Clube managers
Madureira Esporte Clube managers
Associação Desportiva Cabofriense managers
America Football Club (RJ) managers
Sampaio Corrêa Futebol e Esporte managers
Tupi Football Club managers
Olaria Atlético Clube managers
Galícia Esporte Clube managers
Macaé Esporte Futebol Clube managers
Rio Branco Atlético Clube managers
Living people
Sportspeople from Rio de Janeiro (state)